Peter Kuhlman is a Danish headmaster, currently headmaster of Frederiksborg Gymnasium in Hillerød, Denmark. He worked in the Danish Ministry of Education before becoming headmaster.

Kuhlman is the head chairman of Gymnasieskolernes Rektorforening (the union of Danish headmasters of Gymnasiums).

External links
 Article on Kuhlman

Kuhlman
Living people
Year of birth missing (living people)
Place of birth missing (living people)